The 2018 season was the Geelong Football Club's 119th in the Australian Football League (AFL). It was the club's eighth season under senior coach Chris Scott, with Joel Selwood appointed as club captain for a seventh successive year. Geelong (known as the Cats) participated in both the inaugural AFLX competition and the 2018 JLT Community Series as part of their pre-season schedule, and the club's regular season began on 25 March against Melbourne at the Melbourne Cricket Ground (MCG). The Cats finished the home-and-away season with a 13–9 win–loss record and placed eighth on the league's ladder, qualifying for the 2018 finals series as a result. Geelong were defeated in an elimination final against Melbourne by 29 points, and therefore did not progress past the first finals week.

Mark Blicavs was named Geelong's best and fairest player, polling 234 votes for the Carji Greeves Medal ahead of joint runners-ups Patrick Dangerfield and Tim Kelly on 233.5 votes each. It was Blicavs' second Carji Greeves Medal, having previously won the award for the 2015 season. Tom Hawkins was the club's leading goalkicker for the seventh successive season, scoring 60 goals. Dangerfield and Tom Stewart were selected in the 2018 All-Australian team, with Stewart also receiving the AFL Coaches Association's Best Young Player award. The Cats also fielded a reserves team in the Victorian Football League (VFL) and a women's team in the VFL Women's (VFLW) competition. The women's team finished runners-up after they were defeated in the VFLW Grand Final by Hawthorn.

Background 

Chris Scott continued as the club's senior coach for an eighth season, after signing a contract in April 2017 extending his tenure until the end of 2019; during the season, Scott agreed to a new contract to extend this period until the end of 2022. The Cats had four assistant coaches this season, each responsible for specific positions: James Rahilly (forward line), Matthew Knights and Nigel Lappin (midfield), Matthew Scarlett (back line). Corey Enright was also a member of the coaching panel, fulfilling the role of development coach for Geelong's young players. After spending two seasons as the club's director of coaching, Simon Lloyd was appointed to the role of Geelong's football department manager in September 2017, replacing Steve Hocking who had vacated the position to become the AFL's head of football operations.

Joel Selwood was appointed the club's captain for a seventh successive season, with Patrick Dangerfield and Harry Taylor retaining the roles of vice-captain and deputy vice-captain respectively. They were supported by a leadership group made up of teammates Mark Blicavs, Mitch Duncan and Scott Selwood, who all remained in the group from the prior season, with Zach Tuohy the sole promotion to the group.

Ford Australia was the major sponsor of the club for the 2018 season, continuing a long-running deal that started in 1925. GMHBA was the new naming rights sponsor for the Cats' home ground Kardinia Park, with a ten-year deal for the venue to be known as GMHBA Stadium from 2018. Geelong signed up 63,818 members, an increase of 16.3 per cent from the prior year. The average home ground attendance for the Cats this season was 34,207 spectators.

Playing list

Changes 

Following the retirements of premiership players Tom Lonergan and Andrew Mackie at the end of the 2017 season, Geelong delisted Josh Cowan, Matthew Hayball and Tom Ruggles from their playing list; although the Cats committed to redrafting Hayball via the upcoming rookie draft if he was not offered a contract by another club prior. Conversely, after spending the prior two seasons on the club's rookie list, James Parsons was upgraded to the senior list for 2018.

Geelong were involved in three trades during the annual trade period, the first of which involved the Cats exchanging pick 53 in the upcoming national draft for Richmond's future third-round pick in the 2018 edition. Geelong also traded Darcy Lang to Carlton in exchange for pick 58 and a swap of the clubs' fourth-round selections in 2018. Despite showing interest in Jack Watts (Melbourne) and Jake Stringer (Western Bulldogs), the Cats only gained one player via trade: Gary Ablett from Gold Coast (along with pick 24 and a 2018 fourth-round pick), with Geelong parting with pick 19 and their 2018 second-round pick in return. Ablett played for the Cats from 2002 to 2010, and had previously requested an unsuccessful trade back to Geelong at the end of 2016. Additionally, Steven Motlop departed the club as a restricted free agent, after the Cats opted to accept an end-of-first-round draft pick as compensation instead of matching Port Adelaide's offer to Motlop. This was despite Geelong coach Chris Scott stating prior to the free agency period that he hoped Motlop would remain at the club. Geelong's trade period was labelled a "significant gamble" by Josh Elliott of The Roar due to Ablett's age as a 33-year-old. Nathan Schmook of AFL.com.au rated the Cats' trading a 7 out of 10, given the club held picks 22 and 24 in the draft and "will back themselves to find quality talent" with these selections.

Four players were drafted by the Cats in the 2017 national draft: Lachie Fogarty (pick 22), Tim Kelly (24), Charlie Constable (36) and Gryan Miers (57). Christopher Doerre of ESPN.com.au graded the Cats' draft performance as an A+ reasoning that Fogarty and Kelly were "astute selections", and predicting that Constable and Miers "may be two of the draft day steals". In addition to redrafting Hayball (pick 30), Geelong also selected former Essendon and Western Bulldogs player Stewart Crameri (16) in the 2018 rookie draft. Geelong did not participate in the corresponding pre-season draft.

Statistics 
Geelong used 40 players from their playing list this season, with six playing in all 23 of the club's games. There was seven players who played in their first AFL game: Ryan Abbott, Lachie Fogarty, Jack Henry, Jamaine Jones, Tim Kelly, Quinton Narkle and Esava Ratugolea. Stewart Crameri also played his first game for the Cats, having previously played for both Essendon and Western Bulldogs. Tom Hawkins was the club's leading goalkicker for the seventh successive season, scoring 60 goals; Hawkins also finished in third position overall for the Coleman Medal, awarded to the league's highest individual goal-scorer during the regular season.

Season summary 

The fixture for the 2018 season was confirmed by the AFL in October 2017; Geelong were scheduled to play nine games at GMHBA Stadium. This was an increase from the previous season where the Cats played seven games at their home ground. Although uncertain of the impact of Gary Ablett's return to Geelong, Peter Ryan of The Age predicted that the Cats would "qualify high" for the finals due to having "nine home games and a quality midfield". This assessment was reflected in the annual pre-season survey of captains conducted by AFL.com.au, with eight out of the other 17 club captains expecting that Geelong would qualify for the finals this season.

The inaugural AFLX competition was played in February 2018, with games following AFLX rules (which is a modified version of Australian rules football). For this competition, clubs were split into three groups consisting of two pools in each; the top team in each pool played off in a grand final for that group. Geelong won both their pool matches, against Port Adelaide and Fremantle, before losing to Adelaide by eight points in the group grand final; the Cats also participated in the 2018 JLT Community Series as part of their pre-season schedule, playing in two games against Gold Coast and Essendon.

Geelong began the regular season on 25 March against Melbourne at the MCG, with the Cats narrowly winning by three points. Midfielders Joel Selwood and Gary Ablett each garnered 39 disposals in the win; Selwood was playing his 250th game and it was Ablett's return game for the Cats. In the lead-up to the following week's match against Hawthorn on Easter Monday, there was anticipation about Ablett, Selwood and Patrick Dangerfield taking the field together for the first time, with the midfielders labelled the "holy trinity". Dangerfield collected 31 disposals in his first game back from injury, combining with Ablett (35) and Selwood (29) as the three players with the most disposals for the Cats. Despite the impact of this trio, Hawthorn secured a one-point win—although their lead was as much as 25 points early in the final quarter. Travelling to newly-opened Optus Stadium in round 3, the Cats lost to West Coast by 15 points; the crowd of 54,535 was the highest attendance for a sports event in Western Australia. Selwood captained his 143rd match in round 4, surpassing Reg Hickey's 78-year-old record of most games as Geelong captain; the Cats defeated St Kilda in their first game at GMHBA Stadium for the season.

Geelong won three of their next five matches, with the round 6 game against Sydney their sole loss at GMHBA Stadium for the season. Playing against Carlton in round 10, debutant Jamaine Jones scored his first goal with his first kick and the Cats won by 28 points; it was Carlton's first game at GMHBA Stadium since 1997. Geelong won their next two games, including an 85-point win against Gold Coast; the Cats subsequently recorded an 18-point loss in round 13 to reigning premiers Richmond. Heading into their bye in round 14, Geelong were placed fifth on the league's ladder with an 8–5 win–loss record.

Geelong were defeated by Western Bulldogs in their first match following their week off, losing by two points after Cats defender Harry Taylor missed a goal after the siren; it was the seventh consecutive year the Cats had lost after a mid-season bye. Three weeks later Geelong had another opportunity to win after the siren against Melbourne in round 18; this time Zach Tuohy scored a goal for the Cats to win by two points. Geelong recorded a 42-point against Brisbane in round 19, with Tom Hawkins scoring seven goals for a second consecutive game. Geelong's loss in round 20 was the first time Richmond had defeated the Cats twice in a single season since 1982. Geelong's score of 24.14 (158) against Fremantle in round 21 was their highest of the season, with the Cats recording a VFL/AFL record of 23 unanswered goals; the 133-point margin was Fremantle's biggest defeat in the club's history. This dominance was repeated the following week, with the Cats finishing the regular season with a 102-point win over Gold Coast.

These final two wins helped the Cats place eighth on the league's ladder with a 13–9 win–loss record, qualifying for the 2018 finals series. Geelong were defeated in an elimination final against Melbourne by 29 points, and therefore did not progress past the first finals week; it was Melbourne's first finals appearance since 2006. In a post-season review for AFL.com.au, Mitch Cleary described the Cats' season as one that "promised so much but delivered little", and graded their overall performance a "D".

Results

Ladder

Awards 

Geelong held their player awards night at Crown Palladium on 4 October. The club's best and fairest award, the Carji Greeves Medal, was won by Mark Blicavs, who received 234 votes; Patrick Dangerfield and Tim Kelly were joint runners-up with 233.5 votes apiece. It was Blicavs' second Carji Greeves Medal, having previously won the award in 2015. Additionally, George Horlin-Smith received the Tom Harley Award for best clubman, and Jamaine Jones was presented with the Community Champion award. Jack Henry was named the club's Best Young Player.

Dangerfield and Tom Stewart were selected in the honorary 2018 All-Australian team; Blicavs and Tom Hawkins were shortlisted but ultimately not selected in the final squad. Stewart also received the AFL Coaches Association's Best Young Player award, and Kelly was named Best First Year Player by the AFL Players Association. Henry was the Cats' sole nomination for the season's Rising Star award, nominated for his efforts in round 7.

Reserves team 
The club's reserves team, participating in the VFL, was coached by Shane O'Bree for a third season. Tom Atkins was the sole captain, having co-captained the prior season with Jake Edwards and Ben Moloney.

The reserves team finished the regular season with a 13–5 win–loss record and placed third on the league's ladder, qualifying for the finals series as a result. Geelong did not win either of their finals, losing to the Casey Demons in a qualifying final and then the Box Hill Hawks in the semi-finals. Atkins was awarded the club's VFL best and fairest award.

VFL Women's team 

2018 was the club's second season of women's Australian rules football with the club fielding a team in the 2018 VFL Women's season, in preparation for the club's entry into the top-level AFL Women's competition from 2019. Paul Hood and Rebecca Goring continued as the coach and captain from the prior season. The women's team consisted of 39 players who were eligible for selection in matches in 2018.

Geelong finished in fourth at the end of the expanded 16-week home and away season to qualify for the finals. Winning consecutive finals, the Cats progressed to the 2018 VFL Women's Grand Final at Etihad Stadium, falling short to Hawthorn in the decider by 13 points.

Results

Ladder

Awards 
 Best & Fairest: Richelle Cranston
 VFL Women's Team of the Year: Rebecca Goring , Mia-Rae Clifford , Richelle Cranston

Notes

References

External links
 Official website of the Geelong Football Club

2018
Geelong Football Club